Wildflower is a 2017 Philippine revenge drama television series directed by Onat Diaz, Cathy O. Camarillo and Raymund B. Ocampo, starring Maja Salvador, together with an ensemble cast. The series premiered on ABS-CBN's Primetime Bida evening block and worldwide on The Filipino Channel on February 13, 2017, replacing Pinoy Big Brother: Lucky Season 7: Mga Kwento ng Dream Team ni Kuya.

The story follows Ivy Aguas, a beautiful and smart heiress who wants justice for the death of her parents by seeking revenge against the evil Ardiente family. Earlier in the show, Lily Cruz is adopted and becomes Ivy Aguas. Afterwards, she reunites with her mother and, once again, becomes Lily Cruz.

National (Urban + Rural) Ratings are provided by Kantar Media.

Series overview

Legend
  is the highest rating of the entire series.
  is the lowest rating of the entire series.
  is the highest rating per season.
  is the lowest rating per season.

List of episodes

Season 1: Greener Beginnings (2017)

Season 2: Blackest Ivy (2017)

Season 3: Golden Lily (2017)

Season 4: Redish Endings (2017–18)

References

Wildflower (TV series) 
Lists of Philippine drama television series episodes